East Grange railway station is located on the Grange line. Situated in the western Adelaide suburb of Grange, it is 12 kilometres from Adelaide station.

History 

It is unclear when this station was opened.

The railway line between Woodville and Grange opened in September 1882 as a private railway, constructed by the Grange Railway and Investment Company. East Grange is a single platform station on a single track branch line.

A new shelter was constructed at the station in 2017 along with new seating and fencing.

On March 1, 2023, a 74-year-old woman was struck and killed by a train, shutting the line down for several hours and leading to renewed calls for upgrading of crossings on the Outer Harbor and Grange lines.

Services by platform

References

External links

Railway stations in Adelaide